UFO Robo Dangar is an arcade video game released by Nichibutsu in 1986. It is a vertically scrolling shooter in the Moon Cresta series, which includes Terra Cresta and  Terra Force. The game is inspired by the anime series UFO Robo Grendizer and Danguard Ace.

External links
 
Dangar - Ufo Robo at Arcade History

1986 video games
Arcade video games
Arcade-only video games
Nihon Bussan games
Vertically-oriented video games
Vertically scrolling shooters
Video games developed in Japan